Henry Basil Oswin Robinson (3 March 1919 in Eastbourne, Sussex, England – 21 December 2012) was a Canadian cricketer. He was a right-handed batsman and an off-break bowler. He played 19 first-class matches for Oxford University in 1947 and 1948. Later, he played five first-class matches for Canada in the 1950s. He took 53 first-class wickets in his career at an average of 27.20, with best bowling figures of 6/55 playing for Oxford University against Worcestershire.

Robinson also excelled at soccer, winning the 1938 Challenge Trophy with Vancouver North Shore at the Dominion championship in Winnipeg. He played cricket, soccer and rugby at the University of British Columbia.

References 
 Cricket Archive profile
 Cricinfo profile
Cricket World Profile

1919 births
Canadian cricketers
2012 deaths
Oxford University cricketers
British emigrants to Canada
Sportspeople from Eastbourne
Alumni of Oriel College, Oxford